The Third Lake Washington Bridge, officially the Homer M. Hadley Memorial Bridge, is a floating bridge in the Seattle metropolitan area of the U.S. state of Washington. It is one of the Interstate 90 floating bridges, carrying the westbound lanes of Interstate 90 across Lake Washington between Mercer Island and Seattle. The floating bridge is the fifth-longest of its kind in the world, at 5,811 feet (1,772 m).

History

A third floating bridge on Lake Washington was proposed in the 1950s during construction of the Evergreen Point Floating Bridge to the north. After several locations were considered, a span parallel to the existing Lake Washington Floating Bridge (now the Lacey V. Murrow Memorial Bridge) was chosen in the 1960s. The first pontoon for the new bridge was floated from Everett to Lake Washington in September 1983.

The bridge opened in 1989 and is named for Homer More Hadley, who designed the bridge's companion span, the parallel Lacey V. Murrow Memorial Bridge. Hadley also designed the McMillin Bridge in Pierce County. It originally carried bidirectional traffic while the older Murrow Bridge underwent extensive renovations. On November 25, 1990, sections of the Murrow Bridge sank during a windstorm that flooded several pontoons; the sinking sections also severed 13 of the 58 anchor cables of the Hadley Bridge, which remained closed for several days.

Following the reopening of the Lacey V. Murrow Memorial Bridge, two reversible high-occupancy vehicle (HOV) lanes were set up on the Hadley Bridge to accommodate the traffic flow between Seattle and the suburban Eastside (westbound in the morning, eastbound in the evenings). The lanes were opened to all Mercer Island commuters, including single-occupant vehicles, per a 1978 agreement negotiated by the city government. The reversible lanes were planned to be converted for light rail use at a future date, but design issues prevented a simple conversion from being feasible.

Sound Transit and the Washington State Department of Transportation added HOV lanes to the bridge's westbound lanes in 2017. This preceded construction of the East Link light rail line from downtown Seattle to Bellevue and Redmond, which will use the former reversible express lanes. When East Link, scheduled to be completed in 2023, begins operation, it will be the first permanent railroad on a floating bridge. The light rail line will employ a set of floating spans for tracks on the transition between pontoons and the fixed spans. The Maxau Pontoon Rhine Bridge of 1865 in Germany was temporarily used for a railroad.

Usage

The bridge carries four westbound lanes, including a HOV lane, as well as a bicycle and pedestrian path on the north side.

Prior to 2017, it also carried two reversible lanes, configured to normally carry westbound traffic on weekday mornings and eastbound traffic at other times. Use of the reversible express lanes was restricted to HOV traffic, except for vehicles traveling to and from Mercer Island.

With a total of five traffic lanes and three full-sized shoulders, the Third Lake Washington Bridge was the widest floating bridge in the world, until the completion of the new Evergreen Point Floating Bridge in 2016.

See also
Lacey V. Murrow Memorial Bridge
 List of Seattle bridges

References

External links
 Bridge Camera, includes some weather information

Bridges completed in 1989
Bridges in Seattle
Bridges in King County, Washington
Monuments and memorials in Washington (state)
Interstate 90
Road bridges in Washington (state)
Bridges on the Interstate Highway System
1989 establishments in Washington (state)
Pontoon bridges in the United States